Abdelouahad Abdessamad (Arabic: عبد الواحد عبد الصمد; born 24 February 1982) is a Moroccan football defender. He currently plays for Raja Casablanca.

Abdessamad played in the CAF Champions League 2002 final with Raja Casablanca.

References

1982 births
Living people
Moroccan footballers
Raja CA players
Al Ahli Club (Dubai) players
Association football defenders
UAE Pro League players